Hangman's Curfew is a 1941 mystery detective novel by the British writer Gladys Mitchell. It is the twelfth in her long-running series featuring the psychoanalyst and amateur detective Mrs Bradley.

Synopsis
While in Northumberland on a walking holiday a friend of Mrs Bradley encounters a young man who claims that his uncle is being poisoned. She calls in the renowned psychoanalyst who begins making investigations, but is disconcerted to find that the uncle is in apparent good health.

References

Bibliography
 Klein, Kathleen Gregory. Great Women Mystery Writers: Classic to Contemporary. Greenwood Press, 1994.
 Miskimmin, Esme. 100 British Crime Writers. Springer Nature, 2020.
 Reilly, John M. Twentieth Century Crime & Mystery Writers. Springer, 2015.

1941 British novels
Novels by Gladys Mitchell
British crime novels
British mystery novels
British thriller novels
Novels set in England
British detective novels
Michael Joseph books